Atelographus is a genus of beetles in the family Cerambycidae, containing the following species:

 Atelographus decoratus Monne & Monne, 2011
 Atelographus sexplagiatus Melzer, 1927
 Atelographus susanae Monné, 1975

References

Acanthocinini
Cerambycidae genera